Jimmy Lee Chandler (July 19, 1941 - August 10, 2017) was a Southern poet (see Southern literature) and novelist from Tennessee. Chandler's poetry evolved from the post-beat generation through the underground scene. His 276-page poetry collection Smoke & Thunder, was published in 2003. In 2006 he published his first novel, Parallel Blues.

Poetry and prose 

Chandler's works of poetry and prose have been published in a variety of magazines, newspapers and e-zines. Most notably, his poetry earned a coveted role in The Outlaw Bible of American Poetry anthology, edited by Alan Kaufman and S. A. Griffin, in 1999. The 685-page Outlaw Bible gives voice to unconventional poets from the beat poetry of the 1950s to the current age.

Chandler is included in the Tennessee State Library and Archives' Bibliography of Tennessee Local History Sources, Tennessee Authors of Adult Fiction, Poetry & Drama: 1970's - Present.  Additionally, four of his poetry collections are cataloged in the Brown University library.

Chandler's poems, almost without fail, are autobiographical in nature, as are most of his stories, while others are based on characters he's known in settings with which he is familiar.

"In short, I basically write what I know about, which is, or should be, the first rule of writing ... [M]ost of my poetry is of the 'meat' poet school-that is, it has its roots in reality, in happenings and occurrences. I'm a firm believer in that old adage, 'write what you know.' And what do we know better than the things we've been a part of?" (The McKenzie Banner, article chronicling his inclusion into the Tennessee State Library and Archives).

Chandler was the editor and publisher of Thunder Sandwich, an online magazine that featured the works of select writers of prose and poetry.

Journalism 

Chandler worked as a journalist for the Suburban News Bureau in St. Louis, Missouri, before returning to Tennessee in 1985, where for 15 years he was a reporter for The McKenzie Banner.

As a reporter for The McKenzie Banner, Chandler covered the murder of Dennis Brooks, Jr. in Huntingdon, Tennessee.  He later wrote a book about the murder entitled Death on a Dark Highway: The Murder of Dennis Brooks, Jr.

Chandler was featured in an episode of the WE series Women Behind Bars.  He was interviewed as a true crime writer and expert on the Brooks murder case.

Bibliography
 work in Desert Poet 1978/1980
 work in Glyph 1981
 Kid Games (book) 1984
 work in Open 24 Hours 1984
 work in Parnassus 1984
 work in Rawbone 1984
 work in Impetus 1984-1985/2002
 work in Planet Detroit 1985
 St. Louis Blues & Other Poems (book) 1985
 work in Baltimore Sun Sunday magazine 1986
 work in Burnt Orphan 1986
 work in Bouillabaisse 1994
 work in Window Panes 1994
 work in Peshekee River Poetry 1999/2000
 The Word Is All There Is (book) 1999
 work in The Outlaw Bible of American Poetry anthology 1999
 work in 'Savoy 1999
 work in Red Rock Review anthology 2000
 work in Lost Highway anthology 2000
 work in Journal of Modern Writing 2001
 work in Butcher's Block 2000/2001
 featured poet Concrete Wolf 2001
 work in The-Hold 2000-2002
 Inside Jazz (book) 2003
 Smoke & Thunder 276-page collection 2003
 A Touch of Jazz (book) 2004
 Hillbilly Noir (fiction) 2004
 Parallel Blues (novel) 2006
 Death on a Dark Highway: The Murder of Dennis Brooks, Jr. (book) 2010
 Daddy's Fever and Other Stories (fiction) 2011
 Vampire Village Blues (novel) 2010
 The Fourth Night of Forever: Zombieland Blues (novel) 2014
 A Dunbrel of Quat (fnovel) 2016
 Broken Trail: A Western (novel) 2017
 A Fine Day to Travel: A Western (novel) 2017
 Bear Mountain'' (novel) 2017

References

External links
Books by Jim Chandler
Tennessee State Library and Archives Bibliography
Brown University Library

1941 births
2017 deaths
American magazine editors
Writers from St. Louis
20th-century American novelists
Poets from Tennessee
21st-century American novelists
Poets from Missouri
20th-century American poets
21st-century American poets
American male novelists
American male poets
20th-century American male writers
21st-century American male writers
Novelists from Missouri
Novelists from Tennessee
20th-century American non-fiction writers
21st-century American non-fiction writers
American male non-fiction writers